Upper Daintree is a rural locality in the Shire of Douglas, Queensland, Australia.

References 

Shire of Douglas
Localities in Queensland